Rifles of the I.R.A. is the fourth album by Irish folk and rebel band The Wolfe Tones. The album title Rifles of the I.R.A. makes reference to the Irish Republican Army (IRA).

The cover shows the band members dressed in the traditional dress of the IRA.  The folk singer Christy Moore said of the cover, "I equate that particular record sleeve with Foster and Allen, dressed up as leprechauns.  It was the very same thing.  It had the same significance at the time."

Track list 
 Slievenamon
 Erin Go Braugh
 God Save Ireland
 The Sun is Burning
 Big Strong Man
 In Garran na Bhile
 Four Seasons
 Rifles of the I.R.A.
 Skibbereen
 Sweet Carnlough Bay
 Ships in Full Sail
 Sean Tracy (Tipperary So Far Away)
 Holy Ground
 Uncle Nobby's Steamboat

References

External links
 Entry at discogs.com
 

The Wolfe Tones albums
1968 albums